Hŭkkyo station is a railway station located in Hŭkkyo-ri, Hwangju county, North Hwanghae province, North Korea. It is on located on the P'yŏngbu Line, which was formed from part of the Kyŏngŭi Line to accommodate the shift of the capital from Seoul to P'yŏngyang; though this line physically connects P'yŏngyang to Pusan via Dorasan, in operational reality it ends at Kaesŏng due to the Korean Demilitarized Zone.

References

Railway stations in North Korea